Gaudencio Borbón Rosales (born August 10, 1932) is a Roman Catholic Cardinal who was Archbishop of Manila, succeeding Jaime Sin in 2003, and succeeded by Luis Antonio Tagle in 2011. Being the Metropolitan of the ecclesiastical province of Manila, he was the 31st archbishop of Manila and the fourth native Filipino to hold the post, following centuries of Spanish, American, and Irish prelates. During his last year as archbishop, he was concurrently named Apostolic Administrator of the Diocese of Pasig from December 21, 2010, to April 20, 2011, a post he accepted after the resignation of Pasig's first bishop, Francisco San Diego.

Early life and Priestly Ministry
Rosales was born in the then-town of Batangas, Batangas. Rosales' grandfathers were Julián Rosales, a former mayor of the town of Batangas and Pablo Borbón, a former governor of Batangas province. Rosales' father, Dr. Godofredo Dilay Rosales, was one of the first Filipino physicians to acquire his medical school and residency training exclusively in the United States of America, after which he returned home to practice in Batangas City. Rosales' mother, Remedios Mayo Borbón, was a first cousin of the nationalist Claro M. Recto. He is the third of seven siblings, the others being Rosie, Guillermo (deceased), Gabriel, Tessie, Gilbert and Mary Grace.

He attended his elementary education at Batangas Elementary School and St. Bridget’s Grade School and his secondary education at Batangas High School. As a boy, he wanted already to become a priest. He studied theology at the San José Seminary, and had as classmates two other future bishops: Bishop Severino Pelayo, former Military Ordinary of the Philippines, and Bishop Benjamin Almoneda, former Bishop of Daet. On March 23, 1958, he was ordained priest by Lipa Bishop Alejandro Olalia and then assigned to teach for 12 years at St. Francis Minor Seminary, the seminary of the Diocese of Lipa. In 1970, he was given his first parish assignment, the St. Vincent Ferrer Parish in the obscure Barangay Banay-banay in Lipa. In 1972, he was assigned as parish priest of the Immaculate Conception Parish in Batangas City.

Bishop
In 1974, Fr. Rosales was named auxiliary bishop of Manila, the first Batangueño to be named such. Bishop Rosales received his crosier from the Vicar General of Lipa Venerable Alfredo María Obviar (later Bishop of Lucena) and has used it ever since. He took care of the ecclesiastical district of East Antipolo in Rizal, as well as San Juan, Mandaluyong, and Grace Park in Caloocan. Rosales was consecrated bishop of the titular see of Oescus in a ceremony on October 28, 1974, and in 1980 was appointed rector of the archdiocesan major seminary, San Carlos Seminary. On June 9, 1982, he was named coadjutor bishop of Malaybalay in Bukidnon and was later canonically installed as its second bishop on September 14, 1984, after the resignation of Bishop Francisco F. Claver.

Archbishop of Lipa and of Manila
When Archbishop Mariano Gaviola of Lipa retired, Rosales was appointed his successor on December 30, 1992, bringing the latter back to the diocese where he began his ministry. With the announced retirement of Cardinal Jaime Sin, Rosales was named archbishop of Manila by Pope John Paul II on September 15, 2003. He was installed on November 21, 2003.

Cardinal
Rosales's elevation to the College of Cardinals was announced on February 22, 2006. Archbishop Antonio Franco, the Apostolic Nuncio, personally made the announcement at Manila Cathedral during a Mass for the 40th anniversary of the Focolare Movement.

Pope Benedict XVI created Rosales Cardinal-Priest of Santissimo Nome di Maria in Via Latina in the consistory of March 24, 2006. Rosales joined 14 others, two of them Asians, as the newest members of the College of Cardinals. Pope Benedict told the new cardinals: “I want to sum up the meaning of this new call that you have received in the word which I placed at the heart of my first Encyclical: caritas. This matches well the color of your cardinal's robes. May the scarlet that you now wear always express the caritas Christi, inspiring you to a passionate love for Christ, for his Church and for all humanity.” A little later, he added: “I am counting on you, dear Brother Cardinals, to ensure that the principle of love will spread far and wide, and will give new life to the Church at every level of her hierarchy, in every group of the faithful, in every religious institute, in every spiritual, apostolic or humanitarian initiative.”

On February 3, 2007, Rosales was appointed for a five-year term on the 15-member Council of Cardinals for the Study of Organizational and Economic Concerns of the Apostolic See. In 2008, Cardinal Rosales offered his resignation from the governance of the archdiocese, as required under canon law on reaching the age of 75, but Cardinal Giovanni Battista Re communicated that the Holy See had not accepted it. In the same year also, Cardinal Rosales invited Pope Benedict XVI to visit the Philippines, being the third largest Catholic nation in the world; however, the Pope declined due to heavy schedule.

On October 13, 2011, two months after his 79th birthday, Pope Benedict XVI finally accepted his resignation and appointed the then Bishop of Imus, Luis Antonio Tagle, as his successor. On August 10, 2012, along with the celebration of his 80th birthday, he lost his eligibility to vote on any future conclaves and thus, did not participate in the 2013 conclave that elected Pope Francis.

Views

Government
Archbishop Rosales expressed support for charter change but condemned politicians pushing their personal agenda in amending the constitution. When the state of national emergency was proclaimed, he would ask Filipinos to pray for peace and unity in the country and expressed hopes that the government will not abuse and curtail the rights of the people.

National Statistics Office
In 2007, Cardinal Rosales argued against the National Statistics Office (NSO) requirement that all solemnizing officers/priests undergo training before conducting  wedding ceremonies. He said: "We understand the concern of the National Statistics Office (NSO) because we also know of abuses done by the so-called ministers of the Gospel (not priests), but they should not be like that to us, as if we know nothing."

Gay parades
In 2008, Rosales clashed with Ang Ladlad founder Danton Remoto on the subject of allowing gays to participate, in drag, in the Flores de Mayo celebration. Rosales threatened parishes that permit cross-dressing homosexuals to play Saint Helena or female saints in the Santacruzan or Flores de Mayo procession with official punishment and removal from Mass.

Implementing Summorum Pontificum
The guidelines that Rosales wrote for implementing the 2007 motu proprio Summorum Pontificum were reported to have been criticized by Darío Castrillón Hoyos, President of the Ecclesia Dei Commission, as too restrictive. Rosales denied that he had forbidden use of the "Traditional Latin Mass" in his archdiocese, saying he had only opposed celebration by priests of the dissident Society of St. Pius X.

Abortion
On September 16, 2010, Cardinal Rosales issued a pastoral letter expressing the Catholic Church’s condemnation of abortion and recalling the excommunication imposed by the Church on those who procure it or help others to do so. "A deliberately procured abortion is a moral evil and the Catholic Church attaches the canonical penalty of excommunication on those who procure it and on those who help obtain abortion", the pastoral letter read.

Auxiliary Bishops
Below is the list of auxiliary bishops who served during Rosales' term as Archbishop of Manila. The auxiliary bishops are also Vicar-Generals of the archdiocese.
Most Rev. Socrates Villegas, D.D. (2003–2004) (later installed as Bishop of Balanga)
Most Rev. Bernardino Cortez, D.D. (2004–2011)
Most Rev. Broderick Soncuaco Pabillo, D.D. (2006–2011)

Vicars-General
Aside from the auxiliary bishops, the following priests served as Vicar-Generals of Manila during Rosales' time.
Rev. Msgr. Josefino Ramirez, HP (2003–2010)
Rev. Msgr. Francisco Tantoco, HP (2004–2011)

References

External links
 

Vatican Cardinal Bio
Welcome to Archdiocese of Manila Official Website
Biography at Salvador Miranda's "The Cardinals of the Holy Roman Church" website 
Catholic-Hierarchy – Gaudencio Borbón Cardinal Rosales
catholic pages
Rosales Webpage
Asia News

1932 births
Living people
People from Batangas City
Filipino cardinals
Roman Catholic archbishops of Manila
20th-century Roman Catholic archbishops in the Philippines
21st-century Roman Catholic archbishops in the Philippines
Cardinals created by Pope Benedict XVI
Tagalog people
Roman Catholic archbishops of Lipa
Roman Catholic Archdiocese of Manila